Joseph Chailley, also known as Joseph Chailley-Bert (1854–1928) was a French politician. He served as a member of the Chamber of Deputies for Vendée from 1906 to 1914. He was the founder and chairman of the French Colonial Union.

Works

References

1854 births
1928 deaths
People from Yonne
Politicians from Bourgogne-Franche-Comté
Democratic Republican Alliance politicians
Members of the 9th Chamber of Deputies of the French Third Republic
Members of the 10th Chamber of Deputies of the French Third Republic